Wilkniss Mountains is a prominent group of conical mountains,  long running north–south, located  east-southeast of Mount Feather, Quartermain Mountains, in Victoria Land, Antarctica. Except for an outlying southwest peak, the south portion narrows to a series of mainly ice-covered smaller peaks. Named by Advisory Committee on Antarctic Names (US-ACAN) in 1992 after Peter E. Wilkniss, a chemist who from 1975 has served in various positions at the National Science Foundation, including Deputy Assistant Director of the Directorate for Scientific, Technological, and International Affairs; Director, Division of Polar Programs, 1984–93; senior science associate to the assistant director for Geosciences, from 1993.

Features
Level Valley
Pivot Peak

References

Mountain ranges of Victoria Land
Scott Coast